Victorian Railways' Q class was a class of steam locomotives.

The first locomotives came from Phoenix Foundry. They were a class of 10 0-6-0 tender engines built in 1873-74. They were numbered 83-101 (odd numbers only). They were classed Q in 1886. They were taken off register between 1905 and 1908. None were preserved.

External links
 Q class drawing

Q class
0-6-0 locomotives
Railway locomotives introduced in 1873
Broad gauge locomotives in Australia